Matthew Di Rosa (born August 10, 1998) is an American former professional soccer player who played as a defender.

Early life
Di Rosa played youth soccer with Bethesda SC.

College career
In 2017, Di Rosa attended the University of Maryland, College Park to play college soccer. He made his debut on September 29, 2017 against the Northwestern Wildcats.  In 2018, Di Rosa scored the game-winning goal in the national semifinal against Indiana during Maryland's National Championship run. With Maryland, he won the 2018 National Championship. In three seasons with the Terrapins, Di Rosa made 46 appearances, scoring one goal and tallying three assists. His senior season in 2020 was postponed due to the COVID-19 pandemic. Di Rosa was a three-time Academic All-Big Ten, earned the 2018 NCAA Elite 90 Award, was named 2019 CoSIDA Academic All-District, and 2019 CoSIDA Second Team Academic All-American.

Club career
On January 21, 2021, Di Rosa was selected in the first round (25th overall) in the 2021 MLS SuperDraft by Toronto FC. He opted out of the 2021 NCAA season to join Toronto's preseason, but didn't sign with the club.

On July 9, 2021, Di Rosa signed his first professional contract with USL Championship side Loudoun United. He made his professional debut two days later, starting against The Miami FC in a 4–1 loss.  Di Rosa was called up by D.C. United, Loudoun's MLS affiliate, on July 14, 2021, to play in an international friendly against El Salvador Primera División side, Alianza F.C., playing all 90 minutes in the 1-0 win. Di Rosa departed the club after the season.

Personal life
Matt's twin brother, Ben, is also a professional soccer player who played with him at the University of Maryland, and was also draft in 2021, becoming the first set of twins to be drafted in the same MLS SuperDraft.

References

External links 
 Matt Di Rosa Maryland Profile

1998 births
American investment advisors
American soccer players
Association football defenders
Loudoun United FC players
Living people
Maryland Terrapins men's soccer players
Soccer players from Washington, D.C.
Toronto FC draft picks
USL Championship players